Casper Staring (born 1 February 2001) is a Dutch professional footballer who plays as a midfielder for Eerste Divisie club NAC Breda.

Club career
In January 2023, Staring signed a 3.5-year contract with NAC Breda.

References

External links

 Career stats & Profile - Voetbal International

2001 births
Living people
Dutch footballers
Association football midfielders
FC Twente players
NAC Breda players
Eredivisie players
Eerste Divisie players